Żyłowo  is a village in the administrative district of Gmina Stary Lubotyń, within Ostrów Mazowiecka County, Masovian Voivodeship, in east-central Poland.

The village has a population of 98.

References

Villages in Ostrów Mazowiecka County